Anatoma argentinae is a species of minute sea snail, a marine gastropod mollusc or micromollusc in the family Anatomidae.

Description
The length of the shell reaches 5 mm.

Distribution
This marine species occurs in the Atlantic Ocean in the Argentine Basin.

References

External links
 To World Register of Marine Species

Anatomidae
Gastropods described in 2007